Repositioning may refer to:
Adjusting the positioning (marketing) of a product, brand or company
Affirmative Repositioning, a radical movement in Namibia
Drug repositioning, the application of known drugs to treat new diseases
Repositioning maneuver, an epley maneuver used to treat benign paroxysmal positional vertigo
Equity repositioning, a diversifying financial strategy
Repositioning cruise,a cruise in which the embarkation and the disembarkation ports are different